Mac an Iomaire is a Gaelic-Irish surname.

Overview

Mac an Iomaire is a gaelicisation of the Anglo-Irish surname Ridge, which is recorded in County Roscommon in the early 17th century. Some thirty householders named Ridge were located in Connemara, County Galway, according to Griffith's Valuation of 1847-64.

Some use the form Mac Con Iomaire which is, however, a gaelicisation of the surname Montgomery.

Bearers of the name

 Séamus Mac an Iomaire (1891–1967), botanist and writer
 Tom Ridge, Pennsylvania governor and first Director of Homeland Security

External links
 http://www.irishtimes.com/ancestor/surname/index.cfm?fuseaction=Go.&UserID=

Surnames
Irish families
Surnames of Irish origin
Irish-language surnames
Families of Irish ancestry